Events in the year 1613 in India.

Incumbents
Basu Dev, Raja of Nurpur State, 1580-1613
Suraj Mal, Raja of Nurpur State, 1613-1618

Events
Construction of the Tomb of Akbar the Great was completed
Construction of Bhangarh Fort in Rajasthan was completed
Jhansi Fort was built by Raja Vir Singh Deo of Orchha; construction work continued till 1618.
British forces established a factory (trading post) at Surat
Dutch forces established a factory (trading post) at Palakollu
Poet Ganesa, son of Gopal Das, wrote Jatakalankara, a brief Sanskrit treatise comprising one hundred twenty-five slokas on predictive Hindu astrology
St. Michael's Church, Anjuna was constructed in Anjuna, Goa
Defense works at the city of Chaul were expanded

Births
Amar Singh Rathore, a Rajput nobleman affiliated with the royal house of Marwar, and a courtier of the Mughal emperor Shah Jahan, on 11 December
Kavi Bhushan, poet in the courts of the Bundeli king Chhatrasal and the Maratha king Shivaji

Deaths

 
India